Kerrea Kuche Gilbert (born 28 February 1987) is an English footballer.

Career

Arsenal
Gilbert was born in Willesden, London, and until the 2005–06 season he usually played in Arsenal's youth and reserve teams. However, after injuries to various members of Arsenal's defence, Gilbert was drafted in as cover. He made his first team debut on 29 November 2005 against Reading in the League Cup, and on 7 December he played in a UEFA Champions League match against Ajax Amsterdam, coming on as a substitute at left back for the injured Lauren.

With Arsenal's injury problems continuing, he started in Arsenal's FA Cup win over Cardiff City on 7 January 2006, in which he was noted for his pace, which was the start of a six-match run of appearances. He made his Premier League debut on 21 January 2006 in a 1–0 away loss at Everton and played in both legs of Arsenal's League Cup semi-final against Wigan Athletic, in which he contributed to the first Arsenal goal by crossing to Thierry Henry, who headed home; Arsenal lost the tie on away goals after drawing 2–2.

However, Gilbert was himself injured in Arsenal's 3–2 home defeat to West Ham United on 1 February 2006, and was ruled out for two months, ending his run in the team.

On 21 July 2006, Gilbert was loaned to Championship team Cardiff City for the 2006–07 season. Gilbert began the season as the club's first choice right back and was a regular in the team until December. However, he suffered a minor injury which kept him out for several games. He was replaced by Chris Gunter and was unable to force his way back into the starting line-up, meaning he did not feature as much during the second half of the season. Gilbert made 26 appearances for Cardiff, as they narrowly missed out on the play-offs.

He joined Southend United on a six-month loan deal on 30 July 2007. He made six appearances for Southend before falling out of favour with manager Steve Tilson. He returned to Arsenal on 3 January 2008.

On 10 July 2008, Gilbert joined Leicester City on a season-long loan deal for 2008–09. He scored his first league goal for Leicester in a 1–1 draw with Stockport County.

For the 2009–10 season, Gilbert returned to Arsenal. He appeared in Arsenal's 2–0 win over West Bromwich Albion in the League Cup, playing the full 90 minutes. Kerrea also appeared in the 2–1 League Cup win over Liverpool. He also started in his first European game for four years, in an away fixture to Olympiakos, in what was the youngest ever team to play in the Champions League with an average age of 21, beating the previous record held by Ajax.

On 15 January 2010, Gilbert joined Championship side Peterborough United on loan until the end of the season.

Portland Timbers
On 13 December 2010, Gilbert signed with the Portland Timbers, of Major League Soccer; however, as of March 2011, visa issues prohibited him from obtaining a work permit in the United States and his future with the club remained in question. The Timbers announced on 18 March 2011 that Gilbert's P-1 visa had been denied and that they had given up trying to bring the defender to Portland.

Gilbert had a successful trial period with SPL club Inverness Caledonian Thistle, partaking in a number of matches as a trialist. Manager Terry Butcher was concerned over an injury, and said he would offer Gilbert a deal after a few weeks rest. However, Gilbert instead played as a trialist for the Milton Keynes Dons, and Butcher immediately removed the contract offer.

Yeovil Town
Gilbert was offered a 6-month deal at Football League One side, Yeovil Town, after impressing manager Terry Skiverton during pre-season, despite only appearing once in this time. Gilbert's signing came after a long period of time due to the contract confusions with Portland Timbers. Gilbert made his first League appearance for the Glovers on 13 August, during their 3–1 victory over Oldham Athletic, in which Gilbert played 76 minutes before being substituted off. Gilbert was released at the end of his contract in January 2012 after 9 matches for Yeovil Town.

Later career
On 1 February 2012, Gilbert signed for League of Ireland champions Shamrock Rovers for the 2012 season.

On 21 March 2013, he signed for Conference South side Maidenhead United along with ex-QPR trainee Romone Rose.

Gilbert signed for St Albans City on 10 January 2014, and helped them earn promotion to Conference South, though he wasn't involved in the club's successful playoff campaign. He left the Saints by mutual consent at the end of the season.

Career statistics

Honours 
Leicester City
Football League One: 2008–09

Shamrock Rovers
Leinster Senior Cup: 2012

References

External links

1987 births
Living people
Footballers from Willesden
English footballers
Association football defenders
Arsenal F.C. players
Cardiff City F.C. players
Southend United F.C. players
Leicester City F.C. players
Peterborough United F.C. players
Yeovil Town F.C. players
Shamrock Rovers F.C. players
St Albans City F.C. players
Maidenhead United F.C. players
Premier League players
English Football League players
League of Ireland players
Expatriate association footballers in the Republic of Ireland
English expatriate footballers
Black British sportspeople